This Is the Shack is the debut studio album by American G-funk trio The Dove Shack. It was released on August 22, 1995 via G-Funk Entertainment/Def Jam Recordings. The album peaked at #68 on the US Billboard 200 and #13 on the Top R&B/Hip-Hop Albums.

Its lead single, "Summertime in the LBC" featuring Arnita Porter, peaked at #54 on the Hot 100, #37 on the Hot R&B/Hip-Hop Songs, #11 on the Hot Rap Songs, #47 on the R&B/Hip-Hop Airplay, #39 on the Rhythmic, and was featured on the 1995 film The Show. Its second single, Young Jedi-produced "We Funk (The G Funk)", peaked at #44 on the Hot Rap Songs. The title track, "This Is the Shack", previously appeared on Warren G's debut album Regulate... G Funk Era, released a year prior to this album, albeit in a slightly different version.

Track listing 

Sample credits
Track 4 contains elements from "Feels So Good" by Midnight Star (1983)
Track 5 contains elements from "You're Getting a Little Too Smart" by Detroit Emeralds (1973)
Track 6 contains elements from "4 Play" by Y?N-Vee (1994)

Personnel
2Scoop - vocals
Bo-Roc - vocals
C-Knight - vocals
Arnita Porter - additional vocals (tracks: 4, 17)
Tina Davis - additional vocals (track 9)
Ricky Harris - producer (tracks: 1, 6, 11)
Lamon "Sleepy" Turner and Henry "Hank" Thomas - Producer (tracks 4, 16, 17)
Keith Clizark - producer (tracks: 2, 7, 14)
Warren Griffin - producer (track 3)
Jason Mizell - producer (tracks: 5, 13)
Ghetto Klownz - producer (track 8)
Simon Cullins - producer (tracks: 10, 12)
Young Jedi - producer (track 15)
Tony Dawsey - mastering
Aaron Connor - mixing
Greg Geitzenauer - mixing
Tim Carter - photography

References 

G-funk albums
1995 debut albums
The Dove Shack albums
Albums produced by Warren G